Vayu Haralu (born 26 June 1979) is an Indian cricketer. He made his List A debut on 8 October 2019, for Nagaland in the 2019–20 Vijay Hazare Trophy.

References

External links
 

1979 births
Living people
Indian cricketers
Nagaland cricketers
Place of birth missing (living people)